Rolf Andreas Lauten is a Norwegian curler.

At the national level, he is a 1998 Norwegian men's champion curler.

Teams

References

External links

Living people
Norwegian male curlers
Norwegian curling champions
Year of birth missing (living people)
20th-century Norwegian people